"(Nothing But) Flowers" is a song by rock band Talking Heads. It appears on the band's final album Naked, released in 1988. It was released as the album's second single. In addition to the band, the song features Kirsty MacColl on backup vocals and Johnny Marr, formerly of The Smiths, on lead guitar. It peaked at number 79 in the UK Singles Chart. Filmmaker Kevin Smith used the song as the opening of Clerks 2 and was featured briefly in other film soundtracks to Meu Tio Matou Um Cara (as covered by Caetano Veloso)  and the animated feature The Mitchells vs. the Machines. The song is quoted at the start of Bret Easton Ellis' novel "American Psycho" (1991).

Music video
The song's music video featured innovative uses of typography by graphic designers Tibor Kalman and Emily Oberman. The band performs in the video with an expanded lineup featuring Marr, MacColl, Brice Wassy, Yves N'Djock and Abdou M'Boup, all of whom performed on the studio recording of the song. The music video was directed by Sandy McLeod and David Byrne.

Critical reception
On its release, Cash Box wrote, "A vision of a future where civilization is overrun by nature, much to the chagrin of the natives. Byrne is a genius at saying it all between the lines, and this little gem is a light-hearted romp into our greener-grass lives." Music & Media described "(Nothing But) Flowers" as "a rhythmic but also surprisingly melodic song with striking vocal harmonies".

2010 TED Conference
David Byrne performed a briefer version of the song at the 2010 TED conference accompanied by Thomas Dolby on keyboard and the string quartet ETHEL.

Charts

References

1988 singles
Talking Heads songs
EMI Records singles
Songs written by David Byrne
Songs written by Jerry Harrison
Songs written by Chris Frantz
Songs written by Tina Weymouth
Song recordings produced by David Byrne
Song recordings produced by Jerry Harrison
Song recordings produced by Steve Lillywhite
1987 songs